Dr James Wardrop or Wardrope FRSE FRCSEd FRCS (1782–1869) was a Scottish surgeon and ophthalmologist.

Life

Wardrop was born on 14 August 1782, the youngest son of James Wardrop (1738-1830) and his wife, Marjory Marjoribanks, at Torbane Hill, near Linlithgow, West Lothian, but at four years of age moved with the family to live in Edinburgh where he attended the High School, and then St Andrews University. In 1800 he was apprenticed to a firm of surgeon apothecaries which included his great uncle Andrew Wardrop, former president of the Royal College of Surgeons of Edinburgh, and in 1801 was appointed House Surgeon at Edinburgh Royal Infirmary.

He trained in London (1801), Paris and Vienna (1803). He was admitted a Fellow of the Royal College of Surgeons of Edinburgh in 1804. He worked as an ophthalmic surgeon in Edinburgh 1804–08 and was elected a Fellow of the Royal Society of Edinburgh in 1808, upon the proposal of Andrew Wardrop, Alexander Keith of Dunnottar and James Russell. In 1805 he was elected a member of the Aesculapian Club. In 1808 he was sharing a large Georgian house in Edinburgh's First New Town at 4 South Hanover Street.

Wardrop moved to London, where he worked as an ophthalmic surgeon from 1809 to 1869. He was awarded his doctorate (MD) by his alma mater, St Andrews University, in 1834. He taught surgery from 1826 at the Aldersgate Street medical academy with Lawrence and Tyrrell, and published surgical treatises. Wardrop was early appointed Surgeon-in-Ordinary to the Prince Regent. This annoyed his rivals in London, and he found the doors of the large hospitals closed to him. In retaliation he founded the West London Hospital for Surgery near the Edgware Road, and invited general practitioners to watch him operate. Further royal honours came, but he declined a baronetcy (in lieu of royal fees) and moved out of royal circles. His social gifts, a knowledge of horses and marriage to a wife with aristocratic connections brought him popularity.

Wardrop became a Fellow of the Royal College of Surgeons of England in 1843. He died at Charles Street off St James Square, London on 13 February 1869. On his death he was buried in Bathgate Old Kirk.

Works
In 1809, Wardrop published Observations on Fungus Haematodes or Soft Cancer in which he for the first time described as an entity a pediatric eye cancer now known as retinoblastoma; and, unknowingly, a uveal melanoma that he helped to enucleate and that later metastasized to the liver.

Wardrop was associated with Thomas Wakley in the founding of The Lancet in 1823, for which he first wrote savage articles and, later, witty and scurrilous lampoons in his column 'Intercepted Letters'. The letters, under the pseudonym "Brutus", were thinly disguised as by leading London surgeons, revealing their nepotism, venality and incompetence. There was enough truth in them to make the parodies sting.

Family

In 1813 Wardrop married Margaret, daughter of Col. George L. Dalrymple of East Lothian and the widow of Captain Burn. They had four sons and a daughter.

References

Bibliography
 Wardrop, James 1808. Essays on the morbid anatomy of the human eye.
 Wardrop, James 1809. Observations on Fungus Haematodes or Soft Cancer

1782 births
1869 deaths
19th-century Scottish medical doctors
People from West Lothian
People educated at the Royal High School, Edinburgh
Alumni of the University of St Andrews
Fellows of the Royal Society of Edinburgh
Fellows of the Royal College of Surgeons of Edinburgh
Fellows of the Royal College of Surgeons
British ophthalmologists
Scottish surgeons